The Second Attempt of Viktor Krokhin is a 1977 Soviet drama film directed by Igor Sheshukov.

Plot 
The film tells about a boy named Vitya, who grew up without a father. He learned to fight and eventually became a boxer, and took part in the European Championship.

Cast 
 Aleksandr Kharashkevich
 Viktor Poluyektov
 Lyudmila Gurchenko
 Nikolay Rybnikov
 Oleg Borisov
 Mikhail Terentyev		
 Vladimir Zamanskiy
 Lev Lemke
 Ivan Bortnik
 Antonina Bogdanova

References

External links 
 

1977 films
1970s Russian-language films
Soviet drama films
1977 drama films